The New York Conservatory for Dramatic Arts (NYCDA) is a private acting college in New York City. Originally conceived for the purpose of training actors for film and television acting, in 2009 the conservatory gained accreditation to offer Associate degrees in Occupational Studies, a two-year curriculum offered in either Acting for Film & Television or Musical Theater Performance. The New York Conservatory is accredited by the National Association of Schools of Theatre (NAST).

History
Actors in Advertising, which grew into the School for Film and Television (SFT) and later became the New York Conservatory for Dramatic Arts (NYCDA), was founded in 1980 by the late Joan See, who was a student of Sanford Meisner. She also founded Three of Us Studios, a successful casting facility. She is the author of Acting in Commercials: A Guide to Auditioning and Performing On-Camera. See began her acting career more than 50 years ago, and appeared in more than 300 commercials. She worked with many actors, including Julia Roberts, Paul Newman and Eva Gabor. See also served as Vice President of the Screen Actors Guild New York City. Joan See passed away in April 2017. NYCDA founded the annual Joan See Memorial Scholarship in 2018.

1996 saw the accreditation of The New York Conservatory by the National Association of Schools of Theatre, and in 2013 the institution began granting an associate degree in Film & Television Performance. In 2018, The New York Conservatory launched a two-year associate degree in Musical Theater Performance.

NYCDA's campus is located in Manhattan's Chelsea/Flatiron district.

Academics
NYCDA teaches the Meisner technique, pioneered by American master Sanford Meisner. The school offers two-year degrees, which require auditioning, and summer programs, for which auditioning is optional.

 Associate in Occupational Studies: Film and Television Performance
 Associate in Occupational Studies: Musical Theatre Performance
 Associate in Occupational Studies: New Media for Actors
 Four-week summer programs worth 6 transferable credits

Notable students and alumni
 Jacob Batalon
 Ashleigh Murray
 Emma Bell
 Ser'Darius Blain
 Ryan Dorsey
 Shelley Hennig
 Vicky Jeudy
 Manish Dayal
 David Del Rio
 Reid Ewing
Justin Guarini
 Matthew Fox
 Zulay Henao
 Carolina Ravassa
 Alice St. Clair
 Josh Sussman
 Keith Collins
 Ashlynn Yennie

References

External links
 Official website

Drama schools in the United States
Education in New York City
Performing arts education in New York City
Universities and colleges in Manhattan